Purwa is a constituency of the Uttar Pradesh Legislative Assembly covering the city of Purwa in the Unnao district of Uttar Pradesh, India.

Purwa is one of six assembly constituencies in the Unnao Lok Sabha constituency. Since 2008, this assembly constituency is numbered 167 amongst 403 constituencies.

Currently this seat belongs to Bahujan Samaj Party candidate Anil Singh who won in the Assembly election of 2017 Uttar Pradesh Legislative Elections defeating Bharatiya Janta Party candidate Uttam Chandra by a margin of 26,483 votes.

Anil Singh also won in last Assembly election of 2022 Uttar Pradesh Legislative Elections defeating Samajwadi Party candidate Udayraj by a margin of  31061 votes.

References

2017 establishments in Uttar Pradesh
Assembly constituencies of Uttar Pradesh
Unnao district